The Mozart Medal is an award administered by the Mozarteum International Foundation. It derives its name from Wolfgang Amadeus Mozart. The medal is available in three metal types: gold, silver, bronze.

Recipients

Golden

 Lilli Lehmann, 1914
 Max Ott, 1918
 Hermann Abert, 1927
 Friedrich Gehmacher, 1933
 Hermann Zilcher, 1941
 Ludwig Schiedermair, 1942
 Alfred Einstein, 1949
 Georges de Saint-Foix, 1949
 Bernhard Paumgartner, 1951
 Vienna Philharmonic, 1956
 Bruno Walter, 1956
 Karl Böhm, 1956
 Christian Bösmüller, 1957
 Friedrich Gehmacher, 1968
 Richard Spängler, 1985
 Sándor Végh, 1991
 Takahide Sakurai, 1995
 Norio Ohga, 1995
 David Woodley Packard, 2002
 Heinz Wiesmüller, 2003
 Wolfgang Rehm, 2006
 Friedrich Gehmacher jr., 2006
 Nikolaus Harnoncourt, 2011
 András Schiff, 2012
 Miloš Forman, 2013
 Alfred Brendel, 2014
 Mitsuko Uchida, 2015
 Mozarteum Orchestra Salzburg, 2015
 Marc Minkowski, 2016

Silver

 Cecil Bernard Oldman, 1950
 Maria Stader, 1956
 Erich Valentin, 1956
 Hans Sittner, 1971
 Edith Mathis, 1976
 Kurt Neumüller, 1981
 Helmut Eder, 1986
 Peter Schreier, 1975
 Gerhard Wimberger, 1994
 Riccardo Muti, 1998
 Ulrich Konrad, 1999
 Hans Landesmann, 2002
 Peter Ruzicka, 2006

Unknown
 Julius Ebenstein, 1957
 Albert Richard Mohr, 1981
 Leopold Nowak, 1985

See also
 Mozart Medal (disambiguation)

Notes

External links
 Mozarteum International Foundation

Austrian music awards
Awards established in 1914
1914 establishments in Austria-Hungary
Wolfgang Amadeus Mozart
Medals
Establishments in the Empire of Austria (1867–1918)